Marcelino Silverio Izaguirre Sorzabalbere (also known as simply Silverio, 26 April 1898 – 19 November 1935) was a Spanish football player who competed in the 1920 Summer Olympics. He was born in San Sebastián. He was a member of the Spanish team, which won the silver medal in the football tournament.

Notes

References

External links
 
 

1898 births
1935 deaths
Spanish footballers
Footballers from San Sebastián
Spain international footballers
Footballers at the 1920 Summer Olympics
Olympic footballers of Spain
Olympic silver medalists for Spain
Real Oviedo players
Real Sociedad footballers
Olympic medalists in football
Medalists at the 1920 Summer Olympics
Association football forwards